Bharadoba Union is a union parishad under Bhaluka Upazila of Mymensingh District in the division of Mymensingh, Bangladesh.

Geography 
Bharadoba Union is bounded by Dhitpur, Amirabari, Meduary, Mallikbari, Bhaluka and Birunia Union.

Demographics 
According to the National Bureau of Statistics of Bangladesh census report, the number of men and women in the union was 9,888 and 9,238 respectively in 2001.

References 

Unions of Bhaluka Upazila